Kluntarna or Pite-Kluntarna is a Swedish island belonging to the Piteå archipelago in Norrbotten. The island lies on the eastern edge of the archipelago; to the east lies the Gulf of Bothnia. The island has no bridge to the mainland. It has a few buildings but no permanent residents. Kluntarna was part of the Patta Peken Nature Reserve, since 2018 included in the larger Kallfjärden Nature Reserve.

References 

Swedish islands in the Baltic
Islands of Norrbotten County